SB-649,915 is a serotonin reuptake inhibitor and 5-HT1A and 5-HT1B receptor antagonist which is being investigated for its antidepressant effects. Relative to the selective serotonin reuptake inhibitors (SSRIs), SB-649,915 has a faster onset of action and may also have greater clinical efficacy as well. This can be attributed to blockade of 5-HT1A and 5-HT1B autoreceptors which inhibit serotonin release.

See also 
 Elzasonan
 LY-367,265

References 

5-HT1 antagonists
Benzoxazines
Piperidines
Quinolines
Selective serotonin reuptake inhibitors
Lactams
Phenol ethers